The Sunday World is an Irish newspaper published by Independent News & Media. It is the second largest selling "popular" newspaper in the Republic of Ireland, and is also sold in Northern Ireland where a modified edition with more stories relevant to that region is produced. It was first published on 25 March 1973. Until 25 December 1988 all editions were printed in Dublin but since 1 January 1989 a Northern Ireland edition has been published and an English edition has been printed in London since March 1992.

Origins
The Sunday World was Ireland's first tabloid newspaper. Hugh McLaughlin and Gerry McGuinness launched it on 25 March 1973. It broke new ground in layout, content, agenda, columnists and use of sexual imagery.

In 1976 and 1982 it was the only newspaper in the country published on St. Stephen's Day.

The title also publishes a separate Northern Ireland newspaper edition.

It is owned by Independent News & Media, a subsidiary of Mediahuis.

Over the years it has gained a reputation for its hard-hitting crime reporting, special investigations, Irish showbiz and sport analysis and is home to award-winning journalists like Nicola Tallant, Patrick O’Connell, Eddie Rowley and Roy Curtis.

On November 6, 2022 new look paper hit the shops for the first time some years.

Developments
In 2012, a voluntary redundancy scheme was put in place, which was oversubscribed. In early 2013, it was announced that the Irish Daily Star and the Sunday World would start to share some functions.

In 2014, another redundancy scheme was announced. The redundancy scheme was due to the sharing of functions with the Evening Herald.

In March 2017, it was announced that INM are merging the Sunday World and The Herald newsrooms. Later in 2017, INM announced that they were closing the Sunday World website.

Digital archive
Issues from 14 June 1987 to 2006 are online at the British Newspaper Archive.

There plans for a full archive as far back as (1973–present) to mark the papers 50th anniversary in March 2023. In 2022 copies since 2018 were made on the Irish Newspaper Archive.

Investigative journalism
In 2001, a journalist working for the paper in Northern Ireland, Martin O'Hagan, was killed by Loyalist paramilitaries in Lurgan, Co Armagh. O'Hagan was the first journalist to draw attention to the activities of Billy Wright. Wright lived only a few miles from O'Hagan in north Armagh, and had attempted to have the journalist murdered in 1992. The threat was sufficient to cause O'Hagan to temporarily move to the Sunday World office in Dublin, and then to Cork. He continued working for the newspaper, returning to his family in Lurgan in the late 1990s. When killed, O'Hagan became the first reporter covering the Northern Ireland conflict to be killed by paramilitaries.

On 1 May 2005 it alleged double standards by a prominent member of the Democratic Unionist Party (DUP). It claimed that the unionist politician, Paul Berry had been caught in a sting operation by the newspaper when he met a male masseur in a room booked under a false name in a Belfast hotel. According to the paper, Berry asked the man upon meeting him: "I hope you're a Prod?" Berry denied the allegations, claiming that he was seeking treatment for a sports injury, and is considering legal action. In the 2005 general election five days later Berry was the DUP candidate for Newry and Armagh but was one of the few DUP candidates to experience a fall in their share of the vote in favour of the Ulster Unionist Party while everywhere else in the province the DUP gained at the expense of its main rival. The DUP were to the forefront in the campaign of the 1970s and 1980s to stop the decriminalisation of homosexuality in Northern Ireland. On 4 July 2005 it was announced that Berry had been suspended from the DUP following an internal disciplinary panel meeting.

The paper has been noted in its hard-hitting coverage of crime in the Republic of Ireland compared to other papers. It has been to the forefront of exposing the emergence and growth of organised crime in Ireland throughout the 1980s, 1990s and 2000s. In the 1990s it broke the story about the secret life being led by controversial priest Fr Michael Cleary, revealing that he had a secret family with his housekeeper Phyllis Hamilton. Along with the Bishop Eamon Casey story and revelations about clerical child abuse, the Cleary story is viewed as one of the defining moments in the decline of the authority of the Catholic Church in Ireland.

In 2008 the paper was the first to expose the controversial fundraising activities of the House of Prayer run by self-proclaimed visionary Christina Gallagher in Achill, Co Mayo. It also revealed the lavish lifestyle Gallagher was leading. The House of Prayer made over 100 individual complaints to the press ombudsman about the investigation, all of which were dismissed.

In 2005 the paper was sued by a well known Dublin criminal figure Martin "the Viper" Foley after it reported that he was a leading figure in gang related crime and had links with the IRA elements. Foley argued that the report placed his life in jeopardy and sought to gag the paper. The attempt failed as the High Court rejected his allegations and refused to prevent further reporting.

In 2010 the paper won a landmark legal ruling when a privacy and defamation case taken by Ruth Hickey was dismissed by the President of the High Court Mr Justice Nicholas Kearns. The ruling copperfastened the importance of freedom of expression in Irish law and stated that it can only be outweighed by the right to privacy in limited circumstances. Mr Justice Kearns also defended the right of the newspaper to publish information that was clearly in the public domain on the internet (in this case the infamous 'Zip Up Your Mickey' phone rant by Twink whose husband had left her for Ms Hickey).

On 19 March 2006, Sunday World reporter Hugh Jordan tracked down former Sinn Féin official and British Forces informant Denis Donaldson at a remote, rustic cottage in County Donegal. Sixteen days later, Donaldson was murdered there, and the paper was heavily criticised for identifying and showing a photo of the location. In 2009 the Real IRA claimed responsibility for the killing.

On 1 November 2009, Northern Editor Jim McDowell attracted complaints to the Press Complaints Commission after the paper published on the front page the photograph of a man hanging from a bridge, having killed himself under the headline "Halloween Horror". McDowell claimed on Stephen Nolan's BBC Radio Ulster show on 2 November that it was meant to dissuade individuals thinking about suicide but the decision to publish was condemned by suicide awareness and support groups.

It is noted for its strong Irish coverage in a newspaper market awash with 'Irish editions' of the main British newspapers such as the Sunday Mirror and Mail on Sunday. Among its Irish sports writers are Pat Spillane, Paul McGrath, Kevin Moran, Charlie Nicholas, John Aldridge, Denis Irwin and Mick Galwey. Columnists include Amanda Brunker, Paddy Murray, Fr Brian Darcy and Daniel O'Donnell.

On 12 June 2022, it reported about Charlie Bird on his future grave since having Motor neurone disease.

Awards
In 2008, the newspaper won the prize for the Newspaper of the Year (Sunday) at the annual Chartered Institute of Public Relations Press and Broadcast Awards for Northern Ireland.
The Sunday World Investigations Editor Nicola Tallant was named the Crime Reporter of the Year by the National Newspapers of Ireland three times, in 2012, 2016 and 2019.

In 2016, The Sunday World won the prize for 'Scoop of the year' at the Newsbrands Ireland Journalist of the Year awards for its exclusive coverage of the Regency Hotel gangland murder.

Paddy Murray - Columnist of the Year (Popular) - 2016

Pat O’Connell – News reporter of the year – 2016

Eddie Rowley – Showbiz journalist of the year – 2019

Nicola Tallant – Crime journalist of the year – 2012,2016, 2019

Roy Curtis – Sport journalist of the year – 2013, 2019

Alan Sherry – Crime story of the year – 2016

Circulation

In 2019, Independent News & Media exited the ABC auditing process. Hence, no circulation figures are available after 2018.

Christmas Edition
Instead of the normal Sunday World on Sunday for the issue of December 25, 2022 a special Christmas edition will be published on Saturday December 24 with an early deadline of 2.00 p.m. on Friday December 23 for copy. As always the case when Sunday is Christmas Day. After 2022 there will be no year that Christmas Day is falling on Sunday until 2033.

References

External links
Scotsman: Brave journalism reveals Northern Ireland's underbelly

1973 establishments in Ireland
Newspapers published in Ireland
Publications established in 1973
World